Dimitrios Keramitsis (born 1 July 2004) is a Greek professional footballer who plays as a centre-back for Serie A club Roma.

Club career 
Having started to play football in Thessaloniki, where he was born, Dimitrios Keramitsis then played for the likes of PAOK and Aris Thessaloniki, before joining the Empoli academy in Italy in the summer of 2020.

Instrumental in his team under-19 top Italian division title, he attracted the attention of several Serie A clubs, eventually joining AS Roma one year after his arrival in Italy. There he soon became a key member of Alberto De Rossi's Primavera squad.

Brought to the first team squad by José Mourinho, he made his professional debut for Roma on 16 January 2022, replacing Maitland-Niles in the last moments of a 1–0 home Serie A win against Cagliari. By doing so he became the first 2004 to play for the club and the third-youngest foreigner, behind his compatriote Lampros Choutos but in front of players like Marquinhos and Felix Afena-Gyan.

Style of play 
A right-footed centre-back who also makes good use of his left foot—allowing him to build the game from the back—he is described as a physical player, good at marking his opponent and with a fine sense of timing, able to play both in a 3 or 4-men defense.

In his early career, his origins and his debut at Roma soon earned him comparisons with the international defender Kostas Manolas.

Honours

Club 
Roma
 UEFA Europa Conference League: 2021–22

Empoli
 Campionato Primavera:

References

External links 

2004 births
Living people
Greek footballers
Greece youth international footballers
Association football defenders
Footballers from Thessaloniki
A.S. Roma players
Serie A players
Greek expatriate footballers